Raiganj is a city and a municipality in the Indian state of West Bengal. It is the headquarters of the Uttar Dinajpur district. The police station was set up 125 years ago and railway connectivity reached the place 115 years ago. The city houses the 111-year-old Raiganj Coronation High School and more than 50-years-old government primary Raiganj Sarala Sundari GSFP School. Raiganj got its railway connection in 1896. The train used to go to Parbatipur junction in Bangladesh from Raiganj. It is a 200-year-old town.

Etymology
The origin of the name "Raiganj" is not exactly known, and is debated. Some say the name is linked to the royal family of Dinajpur whose surname was Rai. The widely accepted view is that the name originated from the abundance of rai sorshe (a special type of mustard) crops at this place from time immemorial. Many people think that the word "Raiganj" came from "Rai" meaning "Radha", the consort of Krishna. In this connection, "Kaliaganj", nearest city to Raiganj, comes from "Kalia" meaning "Krishna", the central character of Mahabharata.

Geography

Raiganj Wildlife Sanctuary
Raiganj is known for Raiganj Wildlife Sanctuary (also called the Kulik Bird Sanctuary), home to a large population of Asian openbills and other waterbirds and it is the largest bird sanctuary in Asia. Raiganj is situated at the banks of Kulik river which helped the town to become an important place for water connectivity. In course of time, the navigability of Kulik river decreased and business through the waterway was stopped in the first half of the 1970s, especially after the dam was erected to prevent floods. The port area slowly lost its significance and, at present, it is the most backward locality of Raiganj.

Location
The area of this town is about 36.51 km2. The present growing tendency and trend of urbanisation in the area adjacent to this town are also remarkable. The agglomeration areas are also experiencing this trend. Now the vast areas under Birghai, Maraikura, Rupahar, Bahin, Karnojora, and Maharaja Hat are also growing with the population like the town of Raiganj, and this population is dependent on Raiganj town.

In the map alongside, all places marked on the map are linked in the full screen version.

Police stations
Raiganj police station has jurisdiction over Raiganj municipal area and Raignaj CD block and covers an area of 472.13  km2. It has two town outposts – Mohanbati TOP and Bandor TOP. It has another outpost – Karanjora outpost and a police camp at Bhatun.

Raiganj Women police station is located at Raiganj.

CD block HQ
The headquarters of Raiganj CD block is at Raiganj city.

Demographics

In the 2011 census, Raiganj Urban Agglomeration had a population of 199,758, of whom 104,966 were males and 94,792 were females. The 0–6 years population was 22,028. Effective literacy rate for the 7+ population was 81.71 per cent.

As per provisional reports of Census India, the population of Raiganj in 2011 was 183,612, of whom male and female were 96,388 and 87,224 respectively. Although Raiganj city had a population of 183,612, its urban / metropolitan population was 199,690, of whom 104,733 were males and 94,957 were females.

Hinduism was the majority religion in Raiganj city with 97.37% followers. Islam was the second most popular, with approximately 2.16% following it. Christianity was followed by 0.13%, Jainism by 0.16%, Sikhism by 0.05% and Buddhism by 0.05%. Around 0.00% stated 'other religion', and approximately 0.11% stated 'no particular religion'.

 India census, Raiganj had a population of 165,222. Males constituted 53% of the population and females 47%. Raiganj had an average literacy rate of 75%, higher than the national average of 59.5%: male literacy was 79%, and female literacy was 71%. In Raiganj, 11% of the population were under 6 years of age.

Climate
Raiganj has a humid subtropical climate (Köppen Cwa). On average,  of rain falls per year, with most of it falling in the wet season months of June through September.

Transport

Rickshaws, auto-rickshaws, e-rickshaws and city autos are the most widely available public transport in Raiganj. Most residents stay within a few kilometres of the town centre and have their own vehicles, mostly motorcycles and bicycles.

Raiganj railway station is on the Barsoi-Radhikapur branch line. Railway connectivity reached here more than 150 years ago but, due to Indo-Bangladesh partition in 1971 the links through Bangladesh were lost and the railway became only a branch line.

NH 34 passes through Raiganj which connects is to the capital of the state Kolkata. Conversion of the highway to four lanes is going on and the proposed highway will bypass Raiganj by about 6 km. The roadway connectivity suffers due to the traffic jam caused at Dalkhola on a regular basis. Raiganj also lacks in railway connectivity because the station is on a branch line. In the 1960s, the broad gauge line was shifted to Malda-Barsoi-Dalkhola, thus bypassing Raiganj.

Roadways
Raiganj is connected by buses to a few major cities through NBSTC and private bus services. NH 12 and SH 10A are its lifelines. SH 10A connects it to Kaliaganj, Balurghat, Hili. Buses are available all day long to Balurghat, Siliguri, Jalpaiguri, Alipurduar, Coochbehar, Malda, Kolkata, Maharaja Hat and a few other important cities. Overnight bus facilities are available mostly to Kolkata and Dhubri.

Railways

Raiganj railway station is on the Barsoi-Radhikapur branch line. One express train, Radhikapur Express, is available for reaching Kolkata, and a link superfast express train, Radhikapur-Anandvihar Express, is available for going to New Delhi. A couple of Katihar bound local passenger trains and a Siliguri bound DMU passenger can also be availed.

Mamata Banerjee during her tenure as the union railways minister announced railways projects for Raiganj which boosted the communication. The Radhikapur Howrah Kulik Express is also available in morning from Raiganj Railway station inaugurated by MP Debasree Chaudhuri.

 Raiganj-Dalkhola line (43.43 km)
 Raiganj-Itahar-Gazole line
 Kaliyaganj-Buniadpur line

Airways
Raiganj has no airport of its own. The government announced an airport in Raiganj named as Raiganj Airport.

The nearest operating airport is Bagdogra Airport near Siliguri, about 166 km from Raiganj. IndiGo and SpiceJet are the major carriers that connect the area to Delhi, Kolkata, Hyderabad, Guwahati, Mumbai, Chennai, Bangkok, Paro, Chandigarh and Balurghat airport.

Tourism

Raiganj Bird Sanctuary
Situated along the National Highway and by the side of the Kulik river is the Raiganj Wildlife Sanctuary with an area of 35 acres and a buffer area of 286 acres. The forest and water bodies attract migratory birds like the open bill stork, night heron, cormorant, little cormorant and egret from South Asian countries and coastal regions. Local birds like dove, bulbul, sparrow, kingfisher, woodpecker, owl, duck and cuckoo, can also be seen in large numbers.

The migratory birds arrive from the end of May to the first week of July, and depart from mid-December to the end of January. The nesting time is from July to August, and egg laying from August to September. The flying training to the young ones is the best time to observe the birds, around October to November. Every winter nearly 150 different bird species arrive here from the north in numbers ranging from 65,000 to 75,000.

The sanctuary has an artificial network of man made canals which is connected to the River Kulik. During the months of monsoon the flood water from the river enters the plains of the sanctuary. This acts as an important source of food for most of the bird species.

Legal status of the forest:

This bird sanctuary is set to be rejuvenated, with plans of developing a deer park and a tortoise park soon at the core of the sanctuary by the state government.

Raiganj Church

The Raiganj Church is dedicated to St. Joseph the Worker, the patron saint of Raiganj Diocese. The spacious building has glass and ceiling paintings, prominent pillars on both sides modelled on Greek pillars, carved doors and a high altar with an hexagonal dome on top of it.

Jain Temples
Ayodhya is the birthplace for 5 tirthankars Adinath, Ajitnath, Abhinandannath, Sumatinath and Ananthnath. Shri 1008 Digamabar Adinath Jain Mandir is one of the most famous temple in aodhya.  A 31 feet tall Adinath idol in standing posture is present here. This place has been recently developed with the blessings of Acharya ratna Deshbhushanji Maharaj and Ganini Pramukh Aryika Gyanmati Mataji. There is a famous shvetambar temple dedicated to Ajitnatha with a copper-colored idol of 30 cm as its Moolnayak. There are other Jain temples including Kamal Mandir and Chaubisi temple.

Other notable places
There are few other notable tourist destinations nearby, throughout the Uttar Dinajpur district.

 Sap nikla forest and tourists visit the lake and the forest for sightseeing.
 Eco-Tourism at Bijolia More. Here river Sudhani forms an island by dividing into two branches and joining again.
 Temple of Goddess Bhairabi at Bindole.
 Mosque of Burhana fakirs. Mosque of Burhana fakirs.
 Temple of Goddess Kali of Baira at Kaliaganj
 Terracotta pottery and Malgaon at Kunore
 Museum at Karnajora.
 Park at Karnajora.
 Soni Temple Maharaja Hat, Raiganj

Educational institutions

Schools

Raiganj's schools usually use English and Bengali as their medium of instruction, although the use of Hindi is also stressed. The schools are affiliated with the Indian Certificate of Secondary Education (ICSE) or the Central Board of Secondary Education (CBSE) or the West Bengal Board of Secondary Education. Schools include Raiganj Coronation High School, the oldest school in the town, established in 1911, and English medium ICSE High School St. Xaviers School.

Colleges
There are several colleges and a government polytechnic in the town. Raiganj College has been upgraded to Raiganj University, an autonomous, state-owned university. The colleges of Raiganj were affiliated to University of North Bengal, but after the establishment of University of Gour Banga at Malda in 2008, the colleges are now affiliated to University of Gour Banga. Notable colleges include Raiganj Surendranath Mahavidyalaya.

University

Raiganj University
Raiganj University is a public university in Raiganj, in the Uttar Dinajpur district. It offers undergraduate and postgraduate courses in arts, commerce and sciences. It became a university in August 2015. Earlier it was a university college, which was affiliated to the University of North Bengal. It also offers PhD programmes in humanities- and science-based subjects.

Healthcare
As of 2016, the healthcare system in Raiganj consisted of a government super speciality hospital, under the Department of Health & Family Welfare, Government of West Bengal, and quite a few private medical establishments.

Raiganj Government Medical College and Hospital

The college and hospital were inaugurated in 2019. There are two campuses: Abdulghata campus and Dr. B.C Roy Street campus.

Raiganj District Hospital

There are a total of 400 existing beds for patients in different wards of Raiganj district hospital. However, there was no infrastructure for the treatment of dying patients and the patients who suffer from complicated diseases of the kidney and heart. Hence, on most occasions, complicated patients are transferred either to North Bengal Medical College & Hospital in Siliguri or Malda medical college and even to Kolkata which is 444 km away. The patient parties are facing great crisis to shift their patients either to Siliguri or Malda. Sometimes, patients die on the way as a result of complexities.

On 27 November, the state Chief Minister Mamata Banerjee during her visit to Raiganj announced that Raiganj District Hospital would be upgraded to a super specialty hospital and to start new Raiganj Medical College & Hospital in 2018.

Economy

Raiganj remains an important trading centre, running daily business transaction of at least 60 thousand on average, next only to Siliguri. Around two lakh people visit Raiganj every day for business. However, there is no industry as such in Raiganj. In the suburbs, there is a government-undertaken spinning mill with about 800 employees but even that it is struggling. It could shut down any day.

Economy of Raiganj also depends greatly on agriculture. Raiganj is the sole producer of a special quality aromatic basmati rice called Tulaipanji. Tulaipanj rice has been given a Geographical Indication Tag from the Government of India. This rice was even sent to the London Olympics for its aroma and taste. A special kind of brinjal is also produced at Raiganj which is much bigger and tastier than its other species.

Civic administration
There is Raiganj municipality. It is divided into 27 wards. Currently, the All India Trinamool Congress, which has elected most councillors, controls the municipal board. Sandip Biswas of the All India Trinamool Congress is the current chairman of the ongoing board.

Raiganj is the district headquarter of North Dinajpur. The administrative buildings are located at Karnajora, a gram panchayat area five kilometres from Raiganj town. All along, Raiganj was developed in a scattered manner. When West Dinajpur existed, this side was deprived since the district headquarters was in Balurghat.

Raiganj Bhavan
On 23 March 2008, the Union I&B and Parliamentary affairs minister Priya Ranjan Dasmunsi inaugurated the newly constructed Raiganj Bhawan in Kolkata (Kasba area).

Culture

Local dances: Khan dance, Natua, Jang Gan, Mokha dance, Halna Halnani dances, Bhogta dances
Handicrafts: terracotta and jute decorative articles

Media

Newspaper: Newspapers in Raiganj include English language dailies The Statesman and The Telegraph, which are printed in Siliguri, and The Hindustan Times Hitvada and the Times of India, which are printed in Kolkata and received after a day's delay.  In addition, Hindi and Bengali publications, including Anandabazar Patrika, Bartaman, Ganashakti, Uttar Banga Sambad and Dainik Jagran, are available.
Radio: The public station All India Radio is the only radio channel that can be received in Raiganj.
Telecommunications: Airtel, BSNL, Idea Cellular, Reliance Mobile, Vodafone, Jio 4G.
Television: Raiganj receives almost all the television channels available in the rest of the country. Apart from the state-owned terrestrial network Doordarshan, cable television serves most of the homes, while satellite television is common in the outlying areas and in wealthier households.

References

External links

 

 
Cities and towns in Uttar Dinajpur district
Cities in West Bengal